The 2023 Africa Cup of Nations, known for short as the 2023 AFCON or CAN 2023 and for sponsorship purposes as the TotalEnergies Africa Cup of Nations, is scheduled to be the 34th edition of the biennial African international association football tournament organized by CAF. It will be hosted by Ivory Coast for the second time.

This edition of the tournament was supposed to be the 3rd time taking place in the northern hemisphere summer since the 2019 edition to reduce scheduling conflicts with European club teams and competitions. However, CAF postponed this edition to January and February 2024 on 3 July 2022 due to weather concerns in the host country during the summer.

Senegal are the defending champions.

Host selection
Bids: 
  Guinea
   Zambia
  Ivory Coast
  Morocco 
  Tunisia

Rejected Bids:
  Uganda
  Sudan
  Senegal
  Cameroon

CAF announced the hosts for the 2019, 2021 and 2023 editions of AFCON after the final vote at its executive committee meeting on 20 September 2014: 2019 to Cameroon, 2021 to Ivory Coast and 2023 to Guinea.

The announcement of the 2023 hosts was unscheduled. Guinea was one of the bidders for the 2019 and 2021 editions, whose host countries were scheduled to be announced on that day. A CAF spokesperson told BBC News that, on the basis of Guinea's presentation "and commitment", the committee "decided to exercise its power to make an immediate decision."

Host change
On 30 November 2018, CAF stripped Cameroon from hosting the 2019 edition due to lack of speed of progress in hosting preparations, but accepted former CAF President Ahmad Ahmad's request to stage the next edition in 2021. Consequently, the original hosts of 2021, Ivory Coast, would host the 2023 edition, and the original hosts of 2023, Guinea would host the 2025 edition, which until then was yet to have a host.

On 30 January 2019, CAF President confirmed the timetable shift, after a meeting with Ivorian President Alassane Ouattara in Abidjan, Ivory Coast.

Qualification

Qualified teams
The following teams have qualified for the tournament.

Venues
CAF established the following requirements for the expected six stadiums for this edition of the tournament:

In September 2017, the government of Ivory Coast launched a public tender for the venues of the competition. This includes public tender requested bids for renovating and expanding the existing Stade Félix-Houphouët Boigny and Stade de la Paix (Peace Stadium) of Bouaké, and building new stadiums in the cities of Korhogo, San Pedro and Yamoussoukro. The three new stadiums were to have a capacity of 20,000 each.

In addition to the renovation or construction of stadiums, the tender included the renovation or construction of training facilities in the host cities: 8 in Abidjan, and 4 in Bouaké, Korhogo, Yamoussoukro and San Pedro. It also included the construction of 96 villas (5 rooms per villa) in the cities of Bouaké, Korhogo, Yamoussoukro and San Pedro. In addition, bids were to be submitted to build a 3-star hotel of 50 rooms in the city of Korhogo.

Group stage
All times are local, GMT (UTC±0).

Group A

Group B

Group C

Group D

Group E

Group F

Ranking of third-placed teams
The four best third-placed teams from the six groups advance to the knockout stage along with the six group winners and six runners-up.

References

External links
AFCON 2023 organizing committee official website

2023 Africa Cup of Nations
Africa Cup of Nations tournaments
2024 in African football
International association football competitions hosted by Ivory Coast
January 2024 sports events
Scheduled association football competitions